Google Contacts is a contact management service developed by Google. It is available as an Android mobile app, a web app, or on the sidebar of Gmail as part of Google Workspace.

History
Google Contacts originated as the built-in contacts manager in Gmail, which was introduced in as early as 2007. It was later released as an Android app for Nexus devices in 2010, before it became available for all Android phones in 2015.  A standalone web application was released the same year, featuring a revamped user interface. It returned to Gmail in the form of a sidebar in 2020 as part of Google Workspace.

Interpolation
The service can also be synchronized with Apple's Contacts app on iOS and Samsung's Contacts app on Galaxy. It could also be synced with Google Sync before that service was discontinued.

Reception
In 2011, with the introduction of higher-density screens and larger internal memories on Android devices, Google Contacts was heavily criticized for only supporting lower-resolution photos in Android Jelly Bean. This limitation was lifted the following year.

See also
 List of personal information managers
 People (Microsoft service)

References

External links
 

Contacts
Computer-related introductions in 2007
Computer-related introductions in 2015